Andrew Simon Hodgson (born ) is primarily known as an auctioneer/presenter on the British television shopping channel bid tv.

Bid TV 
Andy Hodgson used to be seen presenting bid tv on Sunday between 3.00 pm and 6.30 pm, as well as being a stand-in presenter at other times of the week. He has presented on the channel since its inception in the year 2000. He also provides the voice-over for the majority of their advertising, as well as appearing in-vision for several of them.

His sales technique differs to the other styles of his fellow presenters, and he has been compared with fictional Norwich chat show host Alan Partridge. He often jokes with the production staff and assistants whilst presenting. One such assistant is the unseen warehouse assistant called "Bob the Warehouse".

When phoning the channel to bid for an item, Hodgson's voice greets the bidder with a pre-recorded message detailing the item they are purchasing. Behind the scenes, he was also the Controller of Channels.

Andy announced that after a decade at the channel, he would be leaving.

Other television appearances
Hodgson provided a running commentary over an episode of The Day Today on the DVD of the series. Writer and Alan Partridge co-creator Armando Iannucci (of The Friday Night Armistice fame) hired Andy to play a brutally murdered interior designer in his BBC Three show 2004: The Stupid Version as well as a Home Shopping TV presenter in his 2006 BBC Two production Time Trumpet. In 2003 he appeared on Channel 4 reality show The Salon to conduct a charity auction.

Additionally, Hodgson has been seen in 2008 on ITV1's daytime programme This Morning as a gadget expert.

In 2015 Hodgson presented Win Cash Live, an interactive gambling programme shown on STV.

In 2016 Hodgson appeared as a presenter on Create and Craft USA broadcasting across America. He also appeared on Channel 5 as a reporter for The Championship show, London Live as a football journo and FanTV with Justin Lee Collins.

Since 2020 Hodgson has turned up on TJC, he says he has retired but now in 2022 appears to do more hours than anybody else.

Radio
Hodgson has been heard on BBC Five Live, Radio 4, Talksport, BBC Radio Scotland, BBC Radio York, Century Radio, Star FM and LBC.

Personal life
Although born in Salford, Hodgson grew up in Burnley, Lancashire, and is an ardent supporter of Burnley FC. He has hosted numerous events at the club's Turf Moor ground.

References

External links
 AndyHodgson.com – official website
 Bid.tv – Meet The Hosts: Andy Hodgson
 
 MySpace Page

Living people
Year of birth missing (living people)
English television presenters
People from Burnley